Same Difference is the fifth full-length album by Swedish metal band Entombed. It was released in 1998. This album shows the band moving into a commercial alternative metal sound, and is generally considered the band's weakest moment both by fans, and by the band's former vocalist, LG Petrov.

Track listing

Personnel
Entombed
Jörgen Sandström – bass
LG Petrov – vocals
Alex Hellid – guitars
Ulf "Uffe" Cederlund – guitars
Peter Stjärnvind – drums

Productions
Daniel Rey – producer, engineering, mixing
Stefan Boman – engineering
Jon Marshall Smith – mixing
Howie Weinberg – mastering
Michael Williams – photography (front cover)
Neil Rapi – photography

References

Entombed (band) albums
1998 albums
Albums produced by Daniel Rey